Jakub Pícha (born 21 July 1991) is a Czech football player who currently plays for German club SV Eintracht Elster. He has represented his country at youth international level.

References

External links
 

1991 births
Living people
Czech footballers
Czech First League players
FK Teplice players
Association football defenders
People from Děčín
Sportspeople from the Ústí nad Labem Region